
Listed below are executive orders signed by United States President William McKinley. His executive orders are also listed on WikiSource.

Executive orders

1897

1898

1899

1900

1901

References

 
United States federal policy
William McKinley-related lists